Richard "Dick" P. Hill is a scientist. His work in Applied Molecular Oncology has led to advanced cancer treatments.

He was born in Belfast, Northern Ireland and gained a B.A in Physics from St John's College, Oxford in 1964 and a Ph.D from London University in 1967. He carried out research at the Ontario Cancer Institute from 1967 to 1971, the Institute of Cancer Research, London from 1971 to 1973 and from 1973 at the Ontario Cancer Institute.

In 2015, Hill was a professor at the Ontario Cancer Institute and a Senior Scientist at the Princess Margaret Cancer Centre within the University Health Network, which is affiliated with the University of Toronto Faculty of Medicine.

Honours
 2007, awarded the Robert L. Noble Prize for Excellence in Cancer Research by the Canadian Cancer Society

References

External links 
 Biomed Experts Profile
 University of Toronto Profile

Canadian medical researchers
Cancer researchers
Stem cell researchers
Academic staff of the University of Toronto
Scientists from Belfast
Year of birth missing (living people)
Living people